Tokyo Ghoul was an anime television series by Pierrot aired on Tokyo MX between July 4  and September 19, 2014 with a second season titled Tokyo Ghoul √A that aired January 9 to March 27, 2015 and a third season titled  Tokyo Ghoul:re, a split cour, whose first part aired from April 3 to June 19, 2018. Studio Pierrot also produced an OVA for Tokyo Ghoul: JACK along with a portion of the light novel Tokyo Ghoul: Hibi titled Tokyo Ghoul: PINTO.

Series overview

Episode list

Tokyo Ghoul

Season 1

Season 2: √A

Tokyo Ghoul: re

Season 1

Season 2

OVAs

Notes

References

External links
  

Tokyo Ghoul